"Today's the Day" is a song by Sean Maguire, released in 1997 as his eighth single and his first new recording since his second album Spirit, which was released the previous year. "Today's the Day" does not appear on any of Maguire's albums. The song was a change of style in Maguire's music; while his first two albums had been pop music, "Today's the Day" was almost Britpop in style. The single was unsuccessful and shortly after it was released Maguire decided to leave the music business and return to acting full-time. The single was a moderate success, peaking at #27 in the UK Singles Chart.

Track listing
CD1

CD2

References

1997 singles
Sean Maguire songs
Songs written by Phil Thornalley
Parlophone singles
1997 songs